This is a list of notable rivers of Mongolia, arranged geographically by river basin.

The Mongolian words for river are gol and mörön, with the latter usually used for larger rivers. The Mongolian names also occasionally have a genitive construction, with the name of the river having the suffix -iin or -yn. For example, Ider River is Ideriin Gol, having the meaning "River of Ider".

Longest rivers

 Orkhon River - 
 Kherlen River - 
 Tuul River - 
 Zavkhan River - 
 Selenge River - 
 Hovd River - 
 Eg River - 
 Ider River - 
 Delgermörön -

Flowing into the Arctic Ocean

Yenisei River (Russia)
Angara River (Russia), flowing out of Lake Baikal
Selenge River ( in Sükhbaatar) flowing into Lake Baikal
Chikoy River
Menza River
Katantsa River
Dzhida River (Russia)
Zelter River (Bulgan/Selenge/Russia)
Orkhon River (Arkhangai/Övörkhangai/Bulgan/Selenge)
Tuul River (Khentii/Töv/Bulgan/Selenge)
Tamir River (Arkhangai)
Kharaa River (Töv/Selenge/Darkhan-Uul)
Eg River (Khövsgöl/Bulgan)
Üür River (Khövsgöl)
Uilgan River (Khövsgöl)
Arigiin River (Khövsgöl)
Tarvagatai River (Bulgan)
Khanui River (Arkhangai/Bulgan)
Ider River (Khövsgöl)
Chuluut River (Arkhangai/Khövsgöl)
Suman River (Arkhangai)
Delgermörön (Khövsgöl)
Beltes River (Khövsgöl)
Bügsiin River (Khövsgöl)
Lesser Yenisei (Russia)
Kyzyl-Khem
Büsein River 
Shishged River (Khövsgöl)
Sharga River (Khövsgöl)
Tengis River (Khövsgöl)

Flowing into the Sea of Okhotsk (Pacific Ocean)
Amur River (Russia/China)
Shilka River (Russia)
Onon River (Онон гол)

Flowing into endorheic basins

Hulun Lake
Kherlen River (Хэрлэн гол)

Ulaan Lake 
Ongi River

Great Lakes Depression

Khar-Us Lake 
Khovd River

Uvs Nuur Basin

Rivers draining into endorheic Uvs Lake, forming the drainage of the Uvs Lake Basin
 Kharkhiraa River
Sangil gol
Turuun River 
Nariin gol
Tes River
Shavar River
Tsereg River
Khachig River
Erzin River

Khyargas Lake 
Zavkhan River

Dörgön Lake 
Teeliin gol, flowing out of Khar Lake
Chono Kharaikh gol, draining into Khar Lake

Ulungur Lake 
Bulgan River (Ulungur River)

External links 
 Rivers of Mongolia (Mongolian)

 
Mongolia
Rivers